The 2001 Brasil Open was a tennis tournament played on outdoor hard courts in Costa do Sauipe resort, Mata de São João, in Brazil that was part of the International Series of the 2001 ATP Tour and of Tier II of the 2001 WTA Tour. The tournament ran from 10 September 16 September 2001.

Finals

Men's singles

 Jan Vacek defeated  Fernando Meligeni 2–6, 7–6(7–2), 6–3
 It was Vacek's only title of the year and the 1st of his career.

Women's singles

 Monica Seles defeated  Jelena Dokić 6–3, 6–3
 It was Seles' 2nd title of the year and the 55th of her career.

Men's doubles

 Enzo Artoni /  Daniel Melo defeated  Gastón Etlis /  Brent Haygarth 6–3, 1–6, 7–6(7–5)
 It was Artoni's only title of the year and the 1st of his career. It was Melo's only title of the year and the 1st of his career.

Women's doubles

 Amanda Coetzer /  Lori McNeil defeated  Nicole Arendt /  Patricia Tarabini 6–7(8–10), 6–2, 6–4
 It was Coetzer's 3rd title of the year and the 17th of her career. It was McNeil's 2nd title of the year and the 43rd of her career.

External links
 Official website 
 ATP Tournament Profile

 
Brasil Open
Brasil Open
Brasil Open